Zia-ul-haq (born 18 September 1999) is an Afghan cricketer. He made his first-class debut for Mis Ainak Region in the 2017–18 Ahmad Shah Abdali 4-day Tournament on 20 October 2017. He made his List A debut on 16 October 2021, for Amo Region in the 2021 Ghazi Amanullah Khan Regional One Day Tournament.

References

External links
 

1999 births
Living people
Afghan cricketers
Amo Sharks cricketers
Mis Ainak Knights cricketers
Place of birth missing (living people)